The Test of Legal Ethics is a 40-question, seventy-minute, multiple-choice examination required in South Korea. There are 40 scored questions. The test is developed and administered by the Ministry of Justice. The test's purpose in asking questions pertaining to disciplinary measures is to ascertain knowledge of the relevant rules and regulations.  It is not a test of an individual’s personal ethical values.

Passing score
The passing score is 70% correct (28 questions) out of 40 questions.

See also
 Legal Education Eligibility Test
 MPRE

Law of South Korea
Legal profession exams

ko:대한민국의 법학전문대학원#법조윤리시험